Andrew "Andy" Wirth (born 25 July 1963) is an American businessman and philanthropist who works in the mountain resort and hotel industry. He was most recently the president and CEO of Squaw Valley Ski Holdings, the parent company of Palisades Tahoe and Alpine Meadows ski resorts in Olympic Valley, CA until 2018. He is also the grandson of former US National Park Service Director Conrad Wirth and the great grandson of Theodore Wirth.

Wirth has worked in the mountain resort and hotel industry for 25 years. He began his career with Steamboat Springs Resort in 1986 and served several different marketing and leadership positions at the Steamboat Ski & Resort Corporation and its parent companies. In 2007, Wirth was appointed the chief marketing officer and executive vice president of Intrawest, which acquired Steamboat in 2007. In 2010, Wirth left Steamboat to serve as the President and CEO of Palisades Tahoe, taking over for former CEO Nancy Cushing.

Wirth is a recipient of multiple community service and professional awards including the Chairman's Outstanding Service Award from the Reno-Tahoe Airport Authority Board of Trustees, Steamboat Springs Business Leader of the Year Award and made the HSMAI Top 25 Minds in Hospitality and Travel Sales and Marketing list. In 2014, he was recognized as Citizen of the Year by Disabled Sports USA and received the Community Five Award.

In October 2013, Wirth's right arm was torn off and surgically reattached, as a result of a skydiving accident in Lodi, California. Steamboat Today chronicled his accident and recovery and his connection with Pearl Jam's Eddie Vedder.

Wirth was the Fall 2014 commencement speaker at the graduation ceremony for Colorado State University's Warner College of Natural Resources. In January 2016, Wirth was named the Chairman and President of Reno-Tahoe Regional Air Service Corporation. He is also a former board of directors member at Capital Public Radio, an NPR affiliate in the Sacramento area.

In March 2020, Wirth joined NEOM, a giga project in The Kingdom of Saudi Arabia, as the CEO Mountain Region. NEOM was announced by Saudi Crown Prince Mohammed bin Salman in 2017. The project has been the subject of a number of controversies including bin Salman's implication in the Assassination of Jamal Khashoggi in 2018, and the 2020 attempt to evict the Howeitat Tribe from their historic homeland to make way for the development of Neom.

Early life and education

Andy Wirth was born in Neubrucke, West Germany on 25 July 1963.

Wirth has a Bachelor of Science degree from Colorado State University and attended Edinburgh University in Scotland.

Wirth worked as a backcountry ranger for the Rocky Mountain National Parks and a wilderness ranger in the San Pedro Parks Wilderness Area.  He was also a member of the Hot Shot Wild Land Fire Crew based out of Northern New Mexico.

Early career
Wirth began as an intern with the Steamboat Ski and Resort Corporation in 1986.  He worked at Steamboat for more than 20 years, serving in many different marketing positions within Steamboat and for ownership groups involved in the ski resort industry, while based out of Steamboat.  In 2007, he was promoted into the parent company Intrawest, which completed acquisition of Steamboat in 2006 for $265 million, and he was named the chief marketing officer and executive vice president of sales and marketing. At Intrawest, Wirth managed domestic and global marketing strategy, overseeing Intrawest's full portfolio of mountain and ski resorts

Wirth also led and founded the Mountain Village Partnership (MVP) in 2009, serving as president of the board of directors of the organization. MVP is a business and marketing promotion group supporting local businesses, and it is sponsored by Steamboat.

Wirth was active in Steamboat Springs, serving as chairman of the board of directors for the Steamboat Springs Winter Sports Club, a 100-year-old organization responsible for the development of winter sports athletes and staging of winter competitive sporting events. Wirth also served as a volunteer fireman and then board member of the North Routt Fire Protection District.

In 2010, he helped direct Steamboat's Olympic send-off for the American Winter Olympic teams going to Vancouver.  Wirth was also involved in two previous Olympic send-off celebrations in 2002 and 2006.

Palisades Tahoe (Squaw Valley)
In the summer of August 2010, Wirth was appointed the President and CEO of Palisades Tahoe ski resort. He replaced former CEO Nancy Cushing, who was exited from the position after 16 years as president and CEO. Until Wirth took over, Palisades Tahoe had always been under the direction of the Cushing family after the ski resort was founded by Wayne Poulsen in the 1940s and later owned by Nancy's late husband, Alex Cushing.

Under Wirth's direction as CEO, the company underwent a $70 million upgrade. Changes included vastly improved mountain design and infrastructure, renovations to culinary, base area facilities, lodging and common areas and were funded by KSL Capital Partners, which bought Palisades Tahoe in November 2010. Improvements have also included much-needed alterations to the customer experience. According to Wirth, "[Palisades Tahoe] moved from the bottom 20 percent of ski resorts into the top 20 percent over the year" for customer service satisfaction.

In September 2011, it was announced that Alpine Meadows Ski Resort and nearby Palisades Tahoe would merge to offer a combined ticket pass to customers. Wirth led the acquisition of Alpine Meadows and was the President and CEO of both resorts.

Palisades Tahoe, north of Lake Tahoe in California, was home to the 1960 Winter Olympics and combined with Alpine Meadows offers over 6000 acres of skiable terrain for visitors.

Wirth is featured on the 8 March 2013 episode of Undercover Boss, where he goes undercover at his Palisades Tahoe and Alpine Meadows ski resorts.

In 2017, Squaw Valley Ski Holdings, KSL Capital Partners and the Henry Crown Company merged. The resulting holding company acquired Intrawest Resort Holdings and Mammoth Resorts.

Andy Wirth announced his retirement from Palisades Tahoe on 14 April 2018.

Renewable energy
By 2018, Palisades Tahoe announced a plan to get electricity from carbon-free sources. The company started using renewable energy at two of its resorts, building a mountain-side storage facility for Tesla Inc. batteries. Wirth stated that Palisades Tahoe would be operated by 100% renewable-sourced energy by the end of the 2018 to reduce its carbon footprint.

Philanthropy

Wirth is a member of the Tahoe Fund "Founders Circle" and is a major supporter and contributor to environmental and community service organizations, including the Humane Society of Tahoe Truckee, The Tahoe Truckee Community Foundation Community House, High Fives, The McConkey Foundation, Girls on the Run Sierra Chapter and the Truckee River Watershed Council.

Over the course of his career, Wirth has served as a member or in a leadership role of several community organizations in Steamboat including:

Chairman, Board of Directors – Steamboat Springs Winter Sports Club
Board Member, Yampa Valley Regional Airport Advisory Board
Board Member, North Routt Fire Protection District
Volunteer Fireman, North Routt Fire Protection District

Since arriving in the Lake Tahoe area in 2010 Wirth has served or is serving on the following Boards and community service organizations:

Tahoe Truckee Community Foundation Board of Directors – a not-for-profit organization which awards grants and scholarships in the areas of art, education, youth development, environment, health and human services in the Lake Tahoe area.
Tahoe Fund Board of Directors – a not-for-profit environmental organization formed in 2010 whose mission is to preserve and improve the natural environment around the Lake Tahoe Basin area.
Executive Committee, California Ski Industry Association
North Lake Tahoe Resort Association Board of Directors - an organization promoting the success and vibrancy of regional commerce environment. 
Lake Tahoe Winter Olympics Committee, Board of Directors -  serving as president and Chairman.
National Ski Areas Board of Directors
Chairman of the Reno Tahoe Airport Board of Trustees
Chairman and President of Reno-Tahoe Regional Air Service Corporation

Current philanthropy work outside of the Lake Tahoe Area:
Colorado State University's Master of Tourism Management Advisory Board.
Former Board Member at Capital Public Radio, an NPR affiliate serving Sacramento and surrounding counties.

Awards

Wirth is a recipient of multiple community service and professional awards. In 2012, Wirth was awarded the Chairman's Outstanding Service Award from the Reno-Tahoe Airport Authority Board of Trustees. Wirth was the recipient of the 2002 Steamboat Springs Business Leader of the Year Award. In 2009, he was also awarded a spot on the HSMAI Top 25 Minds in Hospitality and Travel Sales and Marketing list.

In 2014, he was recognized as Citizen of the Year by Disabled Sports USA and received the Community Five Award.

Personal life
In 2013, Wirth was featured in a Wall Street Journal article about his workout routine and trail running. He has competed in half-marathons and triathlons.

In October 2013, Wirth's right arm was torn off and surgically reattached, as a result of a skydiving accident in Lodi, California. Due to changing wind conditions and other factors, Wirth, an experienced and licensed skydiver, along with other skydivers, were not able to make it to the designated landing area.  Wirth landed on steel posts and wires in a vineyard outside the landing area. Wirth was able to slow bleeding of his brachial artery until he was airlifted to the University of California, Davis trauma center, where his arm was reattached. Additional surgeries were performed at the Buncke Clinic at the California Pacific Medical Center. Wirth returned to work after 50 days in the hospital and over 23 surgeries on his right arm.

Wirth announced his retirement as President of Squaw Valley Ski Holdings in April 2018, stating that he would be spending time with his family and "focus on the active support of wounded warriors and environmental causes – advocacy and action."

References

External links
"The Skydiving CEO Who Cheated Death"

Deep Current Gratitude — Around the Oval

American hoteliers
Living people
1963 births
Alumni of the University of Edinburgh
People from Rhineland-Palatinate
Colorado State University alumni
American business executives
American people of Swiss descent
21st-century American businesspeople
Participants in American reality television series